The Internazionali di Tenis Femminili Città di Latina was a tournament for professional female tennis players played on outdoor clay courts. The event was classified as a $50,000 ITF Women's Circuit tournament and was held in Latina, Italy, in 2003 and from 2007 to 2009.

Past finals

Singles

Doubles

External links 
 ITF search 

ITF Women's World Tennis Tour
Clay court tennis tournaments
Tennis tournaments in Italy
Recurring sporting events established in 2003
Recurring sporting events disestablished in 2009
Defunct tennis tournaments in Italy